Anatomy of Distort is an album by Hwyl Nofio.

Track listing
"The Life and Death of Joseph Merrick" 
"Red Herald" 
"I Love You But I Don’t Like You" 
"The Wern" 
" The Face of a Social Butterfly” 
"Murder in the Cathedral”
"The End"

Personnel
Steve Parry:  guitar, prepared piano, tapes, keyboards, percussion, ebow, church organ, effects, Harmonium,Cello
Mark Powell: Saxophone (track 1)
The Oedipus Ensemble (Strings)

References

External links
.
 Musique Machine Interview 

Hwyl Nofio albums
2005 albums